Osobloga (or Austrian German: Ossa) is a river of the Czech Republic and Poland. The river originates as Petrovický potok near the village Petrovice, Czech Republic. It passes through Jindřichov and Osoblaha before crossing the Polish border. It continues through Racławice Śląskie and Głogówek, and flows into the Oder in Krapkowice.

Rivers of Poland
Rivers of the Moravian-Silesian Region
Rivers of Opole Voivodeship
International rivers of Europe